This is an incomplete list of Acts of the Parliament of Great Britain for the years 1760–1779.  For Acts passed up until 1707 see List of Acts of the Parliament of England and List of Acts of the Parliament of Scotland.  See also the List of Acts of the Parliament of Ireland to 1700 and the List of Acts of the Parliament of Ireland, 1701–1800.

For Acts passed from 1801 onwards see List of Acts of the Parliament of the United Kingdom.  For Acts of the devolved parliaments and assemblies in the United Kingdom, see the List of Acts of the Scottish Parliament, the List of Acts of the Northern Ireland Assembly, and the List of Acts and Measures of the National Assembly for Wales; see also the List of Acts of the Parliament of Northern Ireland.

The number shown after each Act's title is its chapter number. Acts are cited using this number, preceded by the year(s) of the reign during which the relevant parliamentary session was held; thus the Union with Ireland Act 1800 is cited as "39 & 40 Geo. 3 c. 67", meaning the 67th Act passed during the session that started in the 39th year of the reign of George III and which finished in the 40th year of that reign.  Note that the modern convention is to use Arabic numerals in citations (thus "41 Geo. 3" rather than "41 Geo. III"). Acts of the last session of the Parliament of Great Britain and the first session of the Parliament of the United Kingdom are both cited as "41 Geo. 3".

Acts passed by the Parliament of Great Britain did not have a short title; however, some of these Acts have subsequently been given a short title by Acts of the Parliament of the United Kingdom (such as the Short Titles Act 1896).

Before the Acts of Parliament (Commencement) Act 1793 came into force on 8 April 1793, Acts passed by the Parliament of Great Britain were deemed to have come into effect on the first day of the session in which they were passed.  Because of this, the years given in the list below may in fact be the year before a particular Act was passed.

1760–1769

1760 (1 Geo. 3)

| {{|Coinage Duties Act 1760|public|16|18-11-1760|note3=|repealed=y|archived=n|}}
| {{|Colonial Trade Act 1760|public|9|18-11-1760|note3=|repealed=y|archived=n|}}
| {{|Commissions and Salaries of Judges Act 1760|public|23|18-11-1760|note3=|repealed=y|archived=n|}}
| {{|Cornwall Duchy Act 1760|public|11|18-11-1760|note3=|repealed=y|archived=n|}}
| {{|Courts-martial, East Indies Act 1760|public|14|18-11-1760|note3=|repealed=y|archived=n|}}
| {{|Game Act 1760|public|21|18-11-1760|note3=|repealed=y|archived=n|}}
| {{|Grants to George Keith Act 1760|public|15|18-11-1760|note3=|repealed=y|archived=n|}}
| {{|Importation Act 1760|public|4|18-11-1760|note3=|repealed=y|archived=n|}}
| {{|Indemnity Act 1760|public|12|18-11-1760|note3=|repealed=y|archived=n|}}
| {{|Insolvent Debtors Relief Act 1760|public|17|18-11-1760|note3=|repealed=y|archived=n|}}
| {{|Justices' Qualification Act 1760|note1=|public|13|18-11-1760|note3=|repealed=y|archived=n|}}
| {{|Marine Mutiny Act 1760|public|8|18-11-1760|note3=|repealed=y|archived=n|}}
| {{|Militia Pay Act 1760|public|22|18-11-1760|note3=|repealed=y|archived=n|}}
| {{|Mutiny Act 1760|public|6|18-11-1760|note3=|repealed=y|archived=n|}}
| {{|National Debt Act 1760|public|7|18-11-1760|note3=|repealed=y|archived=n|}}
| {{|South Sea Company Act 1760|public|5|18-11-1760|note3=|repealed=y|archived=n|}}
| {{|Supply, etc. Act 1760|public|18|18-11-1760|note3=|repealed=y|archived=n|}}
| {{|Supply, etc. Act 1760|public|19|18-11-1760|note3=|repealed=y|archived=n|}}
| {{|Supply, etc. Act 1760|public|20|18-11-1760|note3=|repealed=y|archived=n|}}
| {{|Taxation Act 1760|public|2|18-11-1760|note3=|repealed=y|archived=n|}}
| {{|Taxation Act 1760|public|3|18-11-1760|note3=|repealed=y|archived=n|}}
| {{|Taxation Act 1760|public|10|18-11-1760|note3=|repealed=y|archived=n|}}
}}

1761 (2 Geo. 3)

| {{|Insolvent Debtors Relief Act 1761|public|2|03-11-1761|note3=|repealed=y|archived=n|}}

| {{|Taxation, etc. Act 1761|public|3|03-11-1761|note3=|repealed=y|archived=n|}}

| {{|Taxation, etc. (No. 2) Act 1761|public|4|03-11-1761|note3=|repealed=y|archived=n|}}

| {{|Taxation, etc. (No. 3) Act 1761|public|5|03-11-1761|note3=|repealed=y|archived=n|}}

| {{|Importation Act 1761|public|6|03-11-1761|note3=|repealed=y|archived=n|}}

| {{|Unfunded Debt Act 1761|public|7|03-11-1761|note3=|repealed=y|archived=n|}}

| {{|Window Duties Act 1761|public|8|03-11-1761|note3=|repealed=y|archived=n|}}

| {{|National Debt Act 1761|public|9|03-11-1761|note3=|repealed=y|archived=n|}}

| {{|National Debt (No. 2) Act 1761|public|10|03-11-1761|note3=|repealed=y|archived=n|}}

| {{|Mutiny Act 1761|public|11|03-11-1761|note3=|repealed=y|archived=n|}}

| {{|Marine Mutiny Act 1761|public|12|03-11-1761|note3=|repealed=y|archived=n|}}

| {{|Land Tax Act 1761|public|13|03-11-1761|note3=|repealed=y|archived=n|}}

| {{|Beer Act 1761|public|14|03-11-1761|note3=|repealed=y|archived=n|}}

}}

1762

2 Geo. 3

| {{|Navy Act 1762|public|16|03-11-1761|note3=|repealed=y|archived=n|}}

| {{|Crown Lands, Forfeited Estates Act 1762|public|17|03-11-1761|note3=|repealed=y|archived=n|}}

| {{|Discovery of Longitude at Sea Act 1762|public|18|03-11-1761|note3=|repealed=y|archived=n|}}

| {{|Game Act 1762|public|19|03-11-1761|note3=|repealed=y|archived=n|}}

| {{|Militia Act 1762|public|20|03-11-1761|note3=|repealed=y|archived=n|}}

| {{|London Streets Act 1762|public|21|03-11-1761|note3=|repealed=y|archived=n|}}

| {{|Poor Law Act 1762|note1= Also called the Poor Act 1762 or the Register of Poor Children Act 1762.|public|22|03-11-1761|note3=|repealed=y|archived=n|(infants)}}

| {{|Indemnity Act 1762|public|23|03-11-1761|note3=|repealed=y|archived=n|}}

| {{|Naturalisation Act 1762|note1= Sometimes called the Naturalization Act 1762 or the American Protestant Soldier Naturalization Act 1762.|public|25|03-11-1761|note3=|repealed=y|archived=n|}}

| {{|Importation into Nova Scotia Act 1762|note1=|public|24|03-11-1761|note3=|repealed=y|archived=n|(salt for fisheries)}}

| {{|Papists Act 1762|note1=|public|26|03-11-1761|note3=|repealed=y|archived=n|(deeds and wills of papists)}}

| {{|Court of Session Adjournment Act 1762|note1=|public|27|03-11-1761|note3=|repealed=y|archived=n|}}

| {{|Thefts Upon the Thames Act 1762|public|28|03-11-1761|note3=|repealed=y|archived=n|}}

| {{|Preservation of House Doves, etc. Act 1762|public|29|03-11-1761|note3=|repealed=y|archived=n|}}

| {{|London Bridge Act 1762|public|30|03-11-1761|note3=|repealed=y|archived=n|}}

| {{|Witham Drainage Act 1762|public|32|03-11-1761|note3=|repealed=y|archived=n|}}

| {{|Supply, etc. Act 1762|public|33|03-11-1761|note3=|repealed=y|archived=n|}}

| {{|Supply, etc. Act 1762|public|34|03-11-1761|note3=|repealed=y|archived=n|}}

| {{|Merchant Seamen Act 1762|note1=|public|31|03-11-1761|note3=|repealed=y|archived=n|(American merchant seamen)}}

| {{|Militia Pay Act 1762|public|35|03-11-1761|note3=|repealed=y|archived=n|}}

| {{|Stamps Act 1762|public|36|03-11-1761|note3=|repealed=y|archived=n|}}

| {{|Hampshire, Kent, Sussex Fortifications Act 1762|public|37|03-11-1761|note3=|repealed=y|archived=n|}}

| {{|Kingston-upon-Hull: Small Debts Act 1762|public|38|03-11-1761|note3=|repealed=y|archived=n|}}

}}

3 Geo. 3

| {{|Taxation (No. 2) Act 1762|public|2|25-11-1762|note3=|repealed=y|archived=n|}}

| {{|Marine Mutiny Act 1762|public|3|25-11-1762|note3=|repealed=y|archived=n|}}

| {{|Land Tax Act 1762|public|4|25-11-1762|note3=|repealed=y|archived=n|}}

| {{|Indemnity Act 1762|public|5|25-11-1762|note3=|repealed=y|archived=n|}}

| {{|Bread Act 1762|public|6|25-11-1762|note3=|repealed=y|archived=n|}}

| {{|Mutiny Act 1762|public|7|25-11-1762|note3=|repealed=y|archived=n|}}

| {{|Privileges of Exercising Trades Act 1762|public|8|25-11-1762|note3=|repealed=y|archived=n|}}

| {{|National Debt Act 1762|public|9|25-11-1762|note3=|repealed=y|archived=n|}}

| {{|Militia Pay, etc. Act 1762|public|10|25-11-1762|note3=|repealed=y|archived=n|}}

| {{|Bread Act 1762|public|11|25-11-1762|note3=|repealed=y|archived=n|}}

| {{|National Debt Act 1762|public|12|25-11-1762|note3=|repealed=y|archived=n|}}

| {{|Malt Duties Act 1762|public|13|25-11-1762|note3=|repealed=y|archived=n|}}

| {{|Discovery of Longitude at Sea Act 1762|note1= Sometimes called the Discovery of Longitude at Sea (John Harrison) Act 1763.|public|14|25-11-1762|note3=|repealed=y|archived=n|}}

}}

1763

3 Geo. 3

| {{|Greenwich Out-Pensioners Act 1763|public|16|25-11-1762|note3=|repealed=y|archived=n|}}

| {{|Supply, etc. Act 1763|note1=|public|17|25-11-1762|note3=|repealed=y|archived=n|(Treaty of Paris implementation)}}

| {{|Supply, etc. Act 1763|public|18|25-11-1762|note3=|repealed=y|archived=n|}}

| {{|Small Debts, Wiltshire Act 1763|public|19|25-11-1762|note3=|repealed=y|archived=n|}}

| {{|Grease Butter from Ireland Act 1763|public|20|25-11-1762|note3=|repealed=y|archived=n|}}

| {{|Silk Works Act 1763|public|21|25-11-1762|note3=|repealed=y|archived=n|}}

| {{|Customs Act 1763|note1= Also called the Revenue of Customs Act 1763.|public|22|25-11-1762|note3=|repealed=y|archived=n|(encouragement of seizures and prevention of contraband)}}

| {{|Streets, London Act 1763|public|23|25-11-1762|note3=|repealed=y|archived=n|}}

| {{|Parliamentary Elections Act 1763|note1=  Also called the Act Against Occasional Freeholders 1763.|public|24|25-11-1762|note3=|repealed=y|archived=n|(fraudulent voting)}}

| {{|Continuance etc. of Acts Act 1763|note1=|public|25|25-11-1762|note3=|repealed=y|archived=n|(indico plantations and spanish prizes)}}

}}

4 Geo. 3

| {{|Land Tax Act 1763|note1=|public|2|15-11-1763|note3=|repealed=y|archived=n|}}

| {{|Mutiny Act 1763|note1=|public|3|15-11-1763|note3=|repealed=y|archived=n|}}

| {{|Naturalisation Act 1763|note1=|public|4|15-11-1763|note3=|repealed=y|archived=n|(Prince of Brunswick Lunenburg)}}

| {{|(Royal Family)|note1=|public|5|15-11-1763|note3=|repealed=y|archived=n|(naturalisation of Charles William Ferdinand)}}

| {{|Importation Act 1763|note1=|public|6|15-11-1763|note3=|repealed=y|archived=n|An Act to continue for a limited Time the free Importation of Tallow, Hogs Lard, and Grease, from Ireland.}}

| {{|Cider and Perry Act 1763|note1=|public|7|15-11-1763|note3=|repealed=y|archived=n|(duties on wines, cider and perry)}}

| {{|Marine Mutiny Act 1763|note1=|public|8|15-11-1763|note3=|repealed=y|archived=n|}}

| {{|Customs Act 1763|note1=|public|9|15-11-1763|note3=|repealed=y|archived=n|(repeal of duties on beaver skins etc.)}}

| {{|Recognizances (Discharge) Act 1764|note1=|public|10|15-11-1763|note3=|repealed=y|archived=n|(sail cloth, gunpowder, naval stores etc.)}}

| {{|Continuance of Laws Act 1763|note1=|public|11|15-11-1763|note3=|repealed=y|archived=n|(sail cloth, gunpowder, naval stores etc.)}}

| {{|Continuance of Laws Act 1763|note1=|public|12|15-11-1763|note3=|repealed=y|archived=n|(regulation of pilots, landing of rum etc.)}}

| {{|(Supply, etc)|note1=|public|13|15-11-1763|note3=|repealed=y|archived=n|(loan of £2,000,000 for 1764) (sinking fund)}}

| {{|Regulation of Buildings Act 1763|note1= Also called the Building Act, and sometimes dated 1764.|public|14|15-11-1763|note3=|repealed=y|archived=n|(better regulating of buildings etc)}}

| {{|Sugar Act 1763|note1= Also known as the Sugar Act 1764, the American Revenue Act 1764 or the American Duties Act 1764|public|15|15-11-1763|note3=|repealed=y|archived=n|}}

| {{|Infant Trustees and Mortgages Act 1763|public|16|15-11-1763|note3=|repealed=y|archived=n|}}

| {{|Militia Act 1763|note1=|public|17|15-11-1763|note3=|repealed=y|archived=n|}}

| {{|National Debt Act 1763|note1=|public|18|15-11-1763|note3=|repealed=y|archived=n|}}

| {{|Importation into Quebec Act 1763|note1=|public|19|15-11-1763|note3=|repealed=y|archived=n|(salt to Quebec)}}

| {{|Fort of Senegal Act 1763|public|20|15-11-1763|note3=|repealed=y|archived=n|}}

| {{|Affidavits in County of Durham Act 1763|public|21|15-11-1763|note3=|repealed=y|archived=n|}}

| {{|Whale Fishery Act 1763|note1=|public|22|15-11-1763|note3=|repealed=y|archived=n|}}

| {{|Supply, etc. Act 1763|public|23|15-11-1763|note3=|repealed=y|archived=n|}}

| {{|Postage Act 1763|note1=|public|24|15-11-1763|note3=|repealed=y|archived=n|(prevention of frauds and abuses)}}

| {{|National Debt Act 1763|note1=|public|25|15-11-1763|note3=|repealed=y|archived=n|(sail cloth, gunpowder, naval stores etc.)(agreement with Bank of England for supply)}}

| {{|Bounty upon Importation Act 1763|note1=|public|26|15-11-1763|note3=|repealed=y|archived=n|(hemp and flax from America)}}

| {{|Colonial Trade Act 1763|note1=|public|27|15-11-1763|note3=|repealed=y|archived=n|(sail cloth, gunpowder, naval stores etc.) (rice from Georgia and South Carolina)}}

| {{|Importation Act 1763|note1=|public|28|15-11-1763|note3=|repealed=y|archived=n|(sail cloth, gunpowder, naval stores etc.)}(importation of salt provisions from Ireland; importation of provisions from America)}}

| {{|Whale Fishery Act 1763|public|29|15-11-1763|note3=|repealed=y|archived=n|(Saint Lawrence)}}

| {{|Militia Pay Act 1763|public|30|15-11-1763|note3=|repealed=y|archived=n|}}

| {{|Indemnity Act 1763|public|31|15-11-1763|note3=|repealed=y|archived=n|}}

| {{|Court of Chancery Act 1763|public|32|15-11-1763|note3=|repealed=y|archived=n|}}

| {{|Bankrupts Act 1763|public|33|15-11-1763|note3=|repealed=y|archived=n|}}

| {{|Paper Bills of Credit Act 1763|note1= Also known as the Currency Act 1764|public|34|15-11-1763|note3=|repealed=y|archived=n|}}

| {{|Hampshire, Kent, Sussex Fortifications Act 1763|public|35|15-11-1763|note3=|repealed=y|archived=n|}}

| {{|Bankrupts, etc. Act 1763|public|36|15-11-1763|note3=|repealed=y|archived=n|}}

| {{|Manufacture of Cambrics Act 1763|note1=|public|37|15-11-1763|note3=|repealed=y|archived=n|}}

| {{|Papists Act 1763|note1=|public|38|15-11-1763|note3=|repealed=y|archived=n|An Act for allowing further Time for Enrolment of Deeds and Wills made by Papists; and for Relief of Protestant Purchasers.|note4=(wills of papists)}}

| {{|Westminster Streets Act 1763|public|39|15-11-1763|note3=|repealed=y|archived=n|}}

| {{|Doncaster: Small Debts, Lighting, etc. Act 1763|public|40|15-11-1763|note3=|repealed=y|archived=n|}}

}}

1764 (4 Geo. 3)
 Bank of England Buildings Act 1764 c 49
 Beverley and Kexby Bridge Road Act 1764 c 76
 Bideford Roads Act 1764 c 87
 Blything, Suffolk: Poor Relief Act 1764 c 56
 Bosmere and Claydon, Suffolk (Poor Relief) Act 1764 c 57
 Burton-upon-Trent and Derby Road Act 1764 c 51
 Callington Roads Act 1764 c 48
 Carlford, Suffolk (Poor Relief) Act 1764 c 58
 Derby and Nottinghamshire Roads Act 1764 c 67
 Derby and Yorkshire Roads Act 1764 c 65
 Derby Roads Act 1764 c 82
 Dover and Rye Harbour Act 1764 c 72
 Dumfries and Roxburgh Roads Act 1764 c 85
 Dunbar Beer Duties Act 1764 c 46
 Edinburgh and Linlighgow Roads Act 1764 c 85
 Glamorgan Roads Act 1764 c 88
 Gloucester and Worcester Roads Act 1764 c 79
 Gloucester (Poor Relief, etc.) Act 1764 c 60
 Hackney Poor Relief Act 1764 c 43
 Hereford and Gloucester Roads Act 1764 c 62
 Kent Roads Act 1764 c 78
 Kingston-upon-Hull: Improvement Act 1764 c 74
 Kirby, Westmorland: Small Debts Act 1764 c 41
 Knaresborough: Water Supply Act 1764 c 93
 Lancashire and Cheshire Roads Act 1764 c 45
 Leicester Roads Act 1764 c 84
 Lincoln Road Act 1764 c 80
 Lincoln Roads Act 1764 c 53
 Loddon and Clavering, Norfolk: Poor Relief Act 1764 c 90
 Mercer's Company, London Act 1764 c 50
 Milford to Portsmouth Road Act 1764 c 63
 Mutford and Lothingland, Suffolk (Poor Relief) Act 1764 c 89
 Nottinghamshire and Derby Roads Act 1764 c 83
 Nottinghamshire Roads Act 1764 c 61
 Portsea Improvement Act 1764 c 92
 Rochdale to Burnley Road Act 1764 c 68
 Salop Roads Act 1764 c 70
 Salop Roads Act 1764 c 81
 Samford, Suffolk (Poor Relief) Act 1764 c 59
 Shillingford Roads and Bridge Act 1764 c 42
 Somerset Roads Act 1764 c 77
 South London Roads Act 1764 c 54
 St. Clement Danes (Poor Relief, etc.) Act 1764 c 55
 Sussex Roads Act 1764 c 44
 Sussex roads Act 1764 c 71
 Tinsley and Doncaster Road Act 1764 c 64
 Wangford, Suffolk: Poor Relief Act 1764 c 91
 Whitby: Improvement Act 1764 c 73
 Wigan: Water Supply Act 1764 c 75
 Wiltshire and Hampshire Roads Act 1764 c 47
 Worksop and Attercliffe Road Act 1764 c 52
 Yorkshire Roads Act 1764 c 66
 Yorkshire Roads Act 1764 c 69

1765 (5 Geo. 3)
 Bank Notes (Scotland) Act 1765 c 49
 Black Sluice Drainage Act 1765 c 86. Sometimes called the Black Sluice Act.
 British Settlements in Africa, etc. Act 1764 c 44. Sometimes called the Trade with Africa and Senegal Act.
 Cloth Manufacture, Yorkshire Act 1765 c 51
 Court of Chancery Act 1765 c 28
 Cultivation of Madder Act 1765 c 18
 Customs, etc. Act 1765 c 29 (silk manufacture)
 (Customs) c 37 (gum senega and gum arabic)
 Customs, etc. Act 1765 c 30
 Customs, etc. Act 1765 c 31 (no bounty on export or duty on import of wheat till 24 August 1765)
 Customs, etc. Act 1765 c 32 (wheat export prevention)
 Customs, etc. Act 1765 c 45
 Customs, etc., Revenues Act 1765 c 43
 Discovery of Longitude at Sea Act 1765 c 11
 Discovery of Longitude at Sea Act 1765 c 20
 Duties in American Colonies Act 1765 c 12 - the Stamp Act 1765
 Ecclesiastical Leases Act 1765 c 17
 Enlargement of Times for Executing Acts, 1765 c 15
 Herring Fishery Act 1765 c 22
 Highways Act 1765 c 38 (highways and turnpikes)
 Importation Act 1765 c 1 (An Act for importation of Salted Beef, Pork, Bacon, and Butter, from Ireland, for a limited time)
 Importation Act 1765 c 3 (Treaty of Paris implementation) (importation from cessions to France and Spain)
 Importation Act 1765 c 10 (free importation of cattle from Ireland)
 Indemnity Act 1765 c 4 (indemnity for omissions to qualify)
 Insolvent Debtors Relief Act 1765 c 41
 Isle of Man Purchase Act 1765 c 26
 Judges' Salaries Act 1765 c 47
 Land Tax Act 1765 c 5
 Land Tax Act 1765 c 21
 Malt, etc. Duties Act 1765 c 2
 Marine Mutiny Act 1765 c 6
 Militia Act 1765 c 36 (English militia)
 Militia Pay Act 1765 c 34 (English militia)
 Minority of Heir to the Crown Act 1765 c 27
 Mutiny Act 1765 c 7
 Mutiny, America Act 1765 c 33
 National Debt Act 1765 c 16 (times of payment of certain annuities)
 National Debt Act 1765 c 23
 National Debt Act 1765 c 42
 Postage Act 1765 c 25 (postage rates)
 Preservation of Fish and Conies Act 1765 c 14
 Prize Money Act c 24 (prize money retained)
 Small Debts, Blackheath, etc. Act c 8 (Hundreds of Blackheath, etc. in County of Kent)
 Small Debts, Chippenham Act 1765 c 9 (Hundreds of Chippenham, etc. in County of Wilts)
 Smuggling Act 1765 c 39. Sometimes called the Mischief Act 1765. (Isle of Man)
 Spitalfields Act 1765 c 48. Also called the Import of Silk Act or the Importation Act 1765. (silk manufacture)
 Stamp Act 1765 c 35
 Stamp Act 1765 c 46
 Supply, etc. Act 1765 c 40
 Unfunded Debt Act 1765 c 19
 Westminster Streets Act 1765 c 13
 Westminster Streets Act 1765 c 50

1766

6 Geo. 3
 American Colonies Act 1766 c 12 - the "Declaratory Act"
 Bounty of Exportation Act 1766 c 45
 Bristol Streets Act 1766 c 34
 Cloth Manufacture, Yorkshire Act 1766 c 23
 Coal Loading: Newcastle and Sunderland Act 1766 c 22
 Coal Trade: Westminster Act 1766 c 35
 Continuance of Laws Act 1766 c 44
 Corn Act 1766 c 17
 Cultivation, etc., of Trees Act 1766 c 36
 Customs Act 1766 c 50
 Customs, etc. Act 1766 c 46
 Customs, etc. Act 1766 c 47
 Customs, etc. Act 1766 c 52
 Duties in American Colonies Act 1766 c 11, also known as the Repeal Act, as it repealed Stamp Act 1765
 Duties on Cider, etc. Act 1766 c 14
 Exchange of Crown Lands in Perthshire Act 1766 c 33
 Frame Work Knitters Act 1766 c 29
 Free Ports, West Indies, etc. Act 1766 c 49
 Highways Act 1766 c 43
 House and Window Duties Act 1766 c 38
 Importation Act 1766 c 1
 Importation Act 1766 c 13
 Importation Act 1766 c 19
 Importation and Exportation Act 1766 c 3
 Importation and Exportation Act 1766 c 4
 Importation and Exportation Act 1766 c 5
 Importation, etc. Act 1766 c 28
 Importation into Quebec Act 1766 c 42
 Indemnity Act 1766 c 7
 Indemnity Act 1766 c 51
 Land Tax Act 1766 c 9
 London Paving and Lighting Act 1766 c 26
 London Widening of Passages, etc. Act 1766 c 27
 Loughborough Navigation Act 1766 c 94
 Malt Duties Act 1766 c 2
 Marine Mutiny Act 1766 c 10
 Militia Pay, etc. Act 1766 c 30
 Mutiny Act 1766 c 8
 Mutiny Act 1766 c 10
 Mutiny in America Act 1766 c 18
 National Debt Act 1766 c 21
 National Debt Act 1766 c 39
 Preservation of Timber Trees Act 1766 c 48
 Regulation of Apprentices Act 1766 c 25
 Regulation of Buildings Act 1766 c 37
 Small Debts, Bath Act 1766 c 16
 Small Debts, Derby Act 1766 c 20
 Small Debts, Kent, etc. Act 1766 c 6
 Spurn Point Lighthouse Act 1766 c 31
 Stamps Act 1766 c 40
 Streets, London Act 1766 c 54
 Streets, Southwark Act 1766 c 24
 Supply, etc. Act 1766 c 41
 Transportation (Scotland) Act 1766 c 32
 Treason Act 1766 c 53
 Unfunded Debt Act 1766 c 15

7 Geo. 3
 British Museum Act 1767 c 18. Sometimes called the British Museum Act 1766.
 Coal Metage, etc., London Act 1766 c 23
 Continuance of Acts, 1766 c 35
 Customs Act 1766 c 20
 Customs Act 1766 c 28
 Customs Act 1766 c 41
 Customs Act 1766 c 45
 Duties (Logwood, etc.) Act 1766 c 47
 Duties on Tea, etc. (American Plantations) Act 1766 c 46
 Edinburgh: Improvements Act 1766 c 27
 Engraving Copyright Act 1766 c 38; "An Act to amend and render more effectual an Act made in the Eighth Year of the Reign of King George the Second, for Encouragement of the Arts of Designing, Engraving, and Etching, Historical and other Prints; and for vesting in, and securing to, Jane Hogarth, Widow, the Property in certain Prints."
 Highways Act 1766 c 42
 Importation Act 1766 c 8
 Importation Act 1766 c 11
 Importation Act 1766 c 12
 Importation Act 1766 c 22
 Importation Act 1766 c 30
 Importation Act 1766 c 43
 Importation and Exportation Act 1766 c 1
 Importation and Exportation Act 1766 c 2
 Importation and Exportation Act 1766 c 3
 Importation and Exportation Act 1766 c 4
 Importation and Exportation Act 1766 c 5
 Importation, etc. Act 1766 c 36
 Indemnity Act 1766 c 7
 Indemnity Act 1766 c 31
 Justices Oaths Act 1766 c 9
 Justices Quorum Act 1766 c 21
 Land Tax Act 1766 c 14
 Malt Duties Act 1766 c 6
 Marine Mutiny Act 1766 c 13
 Militia Act 1766 c 15
 Militia Pay, etc. Act 1766 c 17
 National Debt Act 1766 c 24
 National Debt Act 1766 c 25
 National Debt Act 1766 c 26
 Old Palace Yard Act 1766 c 32
 Papists Act 1766 c 34
 Poor Act 1766 c 39
 Provision for Duke of York, etc. Act 1766 c 19
 Sheriffs, etc. Act 1766 c 29
 Stamps Act 1766 c 44
 Taxation Act 1766 c 33
 Thames Embankment Act 1766 c 37; An Act for compleating the Bridge cross the River Thames, from Blackfryars in the City of London, to the opposite Side in the County of Surrey, and the Avenues thereto on the London Side; for redeeming the Tolls on the said Bridge, and on London Bridge; for rebuilding the Goal of Newgate in the said City; for repairing The Royal Exchange within the same; for embanking Part of the North Side of the said River within certain Limits; and for further continuing, towards those Purposes, the Imposition of Six Pence per Chaldron or Ton of Coals and Culm, imported into the Port of the said City, established by an Act of the Fifth and Sixth Years of the Reign of King William and Queen Mary, and also for carrying on the new Pavements in the City and Liberties of Westminster, and Parishes adjacent; and in the Town and Borough of Southwark; and for other Purposes therein mentioned.
 Turnpike Roads Act 1766 c 40
 Unfunded Debt Act 1766 c 16

1767 (7 Geo. 3)

| {{|Customs Act 1767|public|58|02-07-1767|repealed=y|archived=n|An Act for granting to His Majesty additional Duties on certain Foreign Linens imported into this Kingdom; and for establishing a Fund for the encouraging of the raising and dressing of Hemp and Flax.}}
| {{|East India Company Act 1767|public|49|29-06-1767|repealed=y|archived=n|An act for regulating certain proceedings of the general courts of the united company of merchants of England trading to the East Indies.}}
| {{|East India Company Act 1767|public|57|02-07-1767|repealed=y|archived=n|An act for establishing an agreement for the payment of the annual sum of four hundred thousand pounds, for a limited time, by the East India company, in respect of the territorial acquisitions and revenues lately obtained in the East Indies.}}
| {{|Mutiny in America Act 1767|public|55|02-07-1767|repealed=y|archived=n|An act for further continuing an act of the last session of parliament, intituled, An act to amend and render more effectual, in his Majesty's dominions in America, an act passed in this present session of parliament, intituled. "An act for punishing mutiny and desertion, and for the  better payment of the army and their quarters."}}
| {{|Post Office Offences and Isle of Man Postage Act 1767|public|50|29-06-1767|repealed=y|archived=n|An act for amending certain laws relating to the revenue of the post office; and for granting rates of postage for the conveyance of letters and packets between Great Britain and the Isle of Man, and within that island.}}
| {{|Public Companies Act 1767|public|48|29-06-1767|repealed=y|archived=n|An Act for regulating the Proceedings of certain Public Companies and Corporations carrying on Trade or Dealings with Joint Stocks, in respect to the Declaring of Dividends; and for further regulating the Qualification of Members for voting in their respective General Courts.}}
| {{|Rebellion in America Act 1767|note1=or New York Restraining Act 1767|public|59|02-07-1767|repealed=y|archived=n|An act for restraining and prohibiting the governor, council, and house of representatives, of the province of New York, until provision shall have been made for furnishing the King's troops with all the necessaries required by law, from passing or assenting to any act of assembly, vote, or resolution, for any other purpose.}}
| {{|River Lee Navigation Act 1767|public|51|29-06-1767|repealed=y|archived=n|An Act for improving the Navigation of the River Lee, from the Town of Hertford, to the River Thames and for extending the said Navigation to the Flood Gates belonging to the Town Mill in the said Town of Hertford.}}
| {{|Saint Ives Harbour Act 1767|public|52|29-06-1767|repealed=y|archived=n|An act for erecting a proper and convenient pier at the port of Saint Ives in the county of Cornwall, for the better protection or ships and vessels resorting to the said port.}}
| {{|Supply, etc. Act 1767|public|54|02-07-1767|repealed=y|archived=n|An Act for granting to His Majesty a certain Sum of Money out of the Sinking Fund; and for applying certain Monies therein mentioned for the Service of the Year One Thousand Seven Hundred and Sixty Seven; and for farther appropriating the Supplies granted in this Session of Parliament; for carrying to the Aggregate Fund a Sum of Money which hath arisen by the Two Sevenths Excise; for empowering His Majesty, with the Advice of His Privy Council, to permit the Importation of any Sort of Corn or Grain, Duty-free, into this Kingdom, for a longer Time than is permitted by any Act of this Session of Parliament; and for obviating Doubts in relation to the Meeting of Commissioners for putting in Execution an Act of this Session, for granting an Aid to His Majesty by a Land Tax.}}
| {{|Tea Act 1767|note1=or Indemnity Act 1767|public|56|02-07-1767|repealed=y|archived=n|An Act for Taking Off the Inland Duty of One Shilling per Pound Weight upon All Black and Singlo Teas Consumed in Great Britain; and for Granting a Drawback upon the Exportation of Teas to Ireland and the British Dominions in America, for a Limited Time, upon Such Indemnification to Be Made in Respect Thereof by the East India Company, as Is Therein Mentioned; for Permitting the Exportation of Teas in Smaller Quantities Than One Lot to Ireland, or the Said Dominions in America; and for Preventing Teas Seized and Condemned from Being Consumed in Great Britain.}}
| {{|Brecon Roads Act 1766|public|60|16-12-1766|repealed=y|archived=n|An act for repairing and widening several roads in the county of Brecon.}}

| {{|Addenbrooke's Hospital Act 1767|public|99|20-05-1767|repealed=y|archived=n|An act for establishing and well-governing a general hospital to be called Addenbrooke's hospital in the town of Cambridge.}}

| {{|Ayr Roads Act 1767|public|106|29-06-1767|repealed=y|archived=n|An act for repairing and widening several roads in the county of Ayr.}}
}}

Private acts
 An Act for vesting Part of the Estates of George Duke of Saint Albans in Trustees, for raising Money to pay Debts; and for other Purposes therein mentioned.
 An Act for naturalizing Sophia Magdalen Lamack an Infant.

1768

8 Geo. 3

8 Geo. 3 Sess. 2

}}

1769 (9 Geo. 3)

 Coinage Duties Act 1769 c 25
 Colonial Trade Act 1769 c 27
 Court of Chancery Act 1769 c 19
 Crown Suits Act 1769 c 16
 Customs, etc. Act 1769 c 35
 Customs, etc. Act 1769 c 41
 East India Company Act 1769 c 24
 Exportation Act 1769 c 1
 Exportation, etc. Act 1769 c 28
 Gainsborough: Improvement Act 1769 c 21
 Hides and Skins Act 1769 c 39
 Importation Act 1769 c 4
 Importation Act 1769 c 9
 Indemnity Act 1769 c 12
 Insolvent Debtors Relief Act 1769 c 26
 Land Tax Act 1769 c 5
 Land Tax Act 1769 c 14
 Magdalen Hospital, London Act 1769 c 31
 Malicious Injury Act 1769 c 29
 Malt Duties Act 1769 c 2
 Marine Mutiny Act 1769 c 7
 Militia Act 1769 c 42
 Militia Pay Act 1769 c 40
 Mutiny Act 1769 c 3
 Mutiny in America Act 1769 c 18
 Navy Act 1769 c 30
 Poor Relief Act 1769 c 37
 Saint Bartholomew the Great Parish (Improvement) Act 1769 c 23
 Saint Botolph, Aldgate: Improvement Act 1769 c 22
 Shire Halls, etc. Act 1769 c 20
 Silk Act 1769 c 38
 Smuggling, etc. Act 1769 c 6
 Streets, New Windsor Act 1769 c 10
 Streets, Westminster Act 1769 c 13
 Strood and Rochester: Improvement Act 1769 c 32
 Supply Act 1769 c 36
 Supply, etc. Act 1769 c 33
 Supply, etc. Act 1769 c 34
 Theatres, York and Hull Act 1769 c 17
 Unfunded Debt Act 1769 c 15
 Use of Plate Act 1769 c 11
 Wells Harbour Act 1769 c 8

1770-1779

1770 (10 Geo. 3)

 Blackheath, etc., Small Debts Act 1770 c 29
 Bricks and Tiles Act 1770 c 49
 Chelmsford Gaol Act 1770 c 28
 Colony of New York Act 1770 c 35
 Composition for a Certain Crown Debt Act 1770 c 12
 Corn Act 1770 c 39
 Customs Act 1770 c 17
 Customs Act 1770 c 30
 Customs Act 1770 c 43
 Distempter Among Cattle Act 1770 c 4
 Discontinuance of Duties Act 1770 c 8
 Discovery of Longitude at Sea Act 1770 c 34
 Distemper Among Cattle Act 1770 c 45
 Dog Stealing Act 1770 c 18
 East India Company Act 1770 c 47
 Entail Improvement Act 1770 c 51
 Exportation Act 1770 c 1
 Exportation Act 1770 c 10
 Exportation Act 1770 c 31
 Exportation Act 1770 c 38
 False Weights and Scales Act 1770 c 44
 Game Act 1770 c 19
 Grant of Manor of Corsham to Paul Methuen Act 1770 c 13
 Hemp and Flax Act 1770 c 40
 Importation Act 1770 c 2
 Indemnity Act 1770 c 42
 King's Lynn: Small Debts Act 1770 c 20
 Lancashire: Small Debts Act 1770 c 21
 Land Tax Act 1770 c 6
 Land Tax Act 1770 c 33
 Making of Indigo, etc. Act 1770 c 37
 Malt Duties Act 1770 c 5
 Marine Mutiny Act 1770 c 7
 Militia Pay Act 1770 c 9
 Minehead Harbour Act 1770 c 26
 Mutiny Act 1770 c 3
 Mutiny Act 1770 c 15
 National Debt Act 1770 c 36
 National Debt Act 1770 c 46
 New Office of Excise Act 1770 c 32
 Parliamentary Elections Act 1770 c 16
 Parliamentary Elections Act 1770 c 41
 Parliamentary Privilege Act 1770 c 50
 Plymouth Improvement Act 1770 c 14
 Receiving Stolen Jewels, etc. Act 1770 c 48
 River Nar: Navigation Act 1770 c 27
 Saint Marylebone: Improvement Act 1770 c 23
 Southampton: Improvement Act 1770 c 25
 Supply, etc. Act 1770 c 52
 Thames Coalheavers Act 1770 c 53
 Unfunded Debt Act 1770 c 11
 Watchett Harbour Act 1770 c 24
 Worcester: Improvement Act 1770 c 22

1771 (11 Geo. 3)

 City of London Sewerage Act 1771 c 29
 Clerkenwell: Watching, etc. Act 1771 c 33
 Continuance of Certain Laws, etc. Act 1771 c 51
 Counterfeiting of Copper Coin Act 1771 c 40
 Crown Lands in Meath to Vest in Gerald Fitzgerald Act 1771 c 56
 Crown Lands, Savoy Act 1771 c 4
 Edinburgh: Streets Act 1771 c 36
 Exportation Act 1771 c 37
 Exportation Act 1771 c 39
 Exportation etc. Act 1771 c 1
 Greenland and Whale Fishery Act 1771 c 38
 Hackney Coaches Act 1771 c 24
 Hackney Coachmen Act 1771 c 28
 Highway (Scotland) Act 1771 c 53
 Importation Act 1771 c 8
 Importation Act 1771 c 41
 Importation Act 1771 c 49
 Importation Act 1771 c 50
 Indemnity Act 1771 c 18
 Isle of Man Harbours Act 1771 c 52
 Isle of Wight: Poor Relief Act 1771 c 43
 Keeping, etc., of Gunpowder Act 1771 c 35
 Land Tax Act 1771 c 5
 Liverpool Theatre Act 1771 c 16
 Loans or Exchequer Bills Act 1771 c 25
 London Bridge Act 1771 c 26
 London: Streets Act 1771 c 54
 London: Thames Embankment Act 1771 c 34
 Lottery Act 1771 c 47
 Lunacy Act 1771 c 20
 Malt Duties Act 1771 c 2
 Marine Mutiny Act 1771 c 7
 Militia Act 1771 c 32
 Morden College, Kent Act 1771 c 10
 Mutiny Act 1771 c 6
 Mutiny in America Act 1771 c 11
 Oxford: Poor Relief Act 1771 c 14
 Oxford: Improvement Act 1771 c 19
 Parliamentary Elections Act 1771 c 42
 Parliamentary Elections, New Shoreham Act 1771 c 55
 Saint Botolph, Aldgate: Streets Act 1771 c 23
 Saint John, Wapping: Improvement Act 1771 c 21
 Saint Luke, Old Street (Improvement) Act 1771 c 46
 Saint Mary, Whitechapel: Improvement Act 1771 c 12
 Saint Mary, Whitechapel: Improvement Act 1771 c 15
 South Leith: Improvement Act 1771 c 30
 Southwark Streets Act 1771 c 17
 Supply, etc. Act 1771 c 48
 Supply of Seamen Act 1771 c 3
 Thames and Isis, Navigation Act 1771 c 45
 Tweed Fisheries Act 1771 c 27
 Wakefield (Improvement) Act 1771 c 44
 Westminster: Streets Act 1771 c 22
 White Herring Fisheries Act 1771 c 31
 Winchester: Improvement Act 1771 c 9
 Worcester: Water Supply, etc. Act 1771 c 13

1772

12 Geo. 3
 Allowance for Mint Prosecutions Act 1772 c 52
 Bankrupts Act 1772 c 47
 Bedford Level Act 1772 c 9
 Bills of Exchange (Scotland) Act 1772 c 72
 Birmingham Chapels Act 1772 c 64
 Chatham: Streets Act 1772 c 18
 Christchurch, Middlesex Act 1772 c 38
 Continuance of Certain Laws Act 1772 c 56
 Crown Lands at Richmond, Surrey Act 1772 c 35
 Crown Lands at Richmond, Surrey Act 1772 c 59
 Crown Lands, grant to James Archibald Stuart Act 1772 c 44
 Crown Lands in Fenchurch Street, London Act 1772 c 19
 Crown Lands in Holborn, London Act 1772 c 43
 Customs Act 1772 c 50
 Customs Act 1772 c 60, replaced the Indemnity Act of 1767 (7 Geo 3 c 56), and was replaced by Tea Act 1773
 Discharge to Lady Anne Jekyll's Executors Act 1772 c 53
 Diseases Among Cattle Act 1772 c 51
 Dockyards, &c. Protection Act 1772 c 24
 Drainage: Cambridge, Isle of Ely Act 1772 c 26
 Drainage: Isle of Ely Act 1772 c 27
 Duchy of Lancaster (Precinct of Savoy) Act 1772 c 42
 East India Company Act 1772 c 7
 Edinburgh: Improvement Act 1772 c 15
 Excise Act 1772 c 46
 Exportations and Importation Act 1772 c 1
 Exportations and Importation Act 1772 c 2
 Felony and Piracy Act 1772 c 20
 Great Yarmouth: Improvement Act 1772 c 14
 Gunpowder Act 1772 c 61
 Hackney Coaches Act 1772 c 49
 Herring Fisher Act 1772 c 58
 Importation Act 1772 c 32
 Importation Act 1772 c 33
 Indemnity Act 1772 c 31
 Kidderminster: Small Debts Act 1772 c 66
 Land Tax Act 1772 c 3
 Lazarets Act 1772 c 57
 London Streets Act 1772 c 69
 London: Streets Act 1772 c 17
 Maidenhead Bridge Act 1772 c 41
 Malt Duties Act 1772 c 6
 Marine Mutiny Act 1772 c 5
 Marine Society Act 1772 c 67
 Market Weighton Act 1772 c 37
 Metropolitan Buildings Act 1772 c 73
 Militia Pay Act 1772 c 13
 Municipal Corporations (Mandamus) Act 1772 c 21
 Mutiny Act 1772 c 4
 Mutiny in America Act 1772 c 12
 National Debt Act 1772 c 63
 Naval Prize Act 1772 c 25
 Papists Act 1772 c 10
 Plymouth: Improvement Act 1772 c 8
 Port Glasgow Harbour Act 1772 c 16
 Relief of Insolvent Debtors, etc. Act 1772 c 23
 Repeal of Certain Laws Act 1772 c 71
 Richmond Chapel, Lancashire Act 1772 c 36
 Royal Marriages Act 1772 c 11
 Saint George's Fields, Surrey: Right of Common Extinguished Act 1772 c 65
 Saint Marylebone Church Act 1772 c 40
 Saint Sepulchre Poor: London Streets Act 1772 c 68
 Salaries of Justices of Chester, etc. Act 1772 c 30
 Spurn Point Lighthouse Act 1772 c 29
 Stamps Act 1772 c 48
 Supply, etc. Act 1772 c 70
 Timber for the Navy Act 1772 c 54
 Trade Act 1772 c 55
 Traffic Regulation (Scotland) Act 1772 c 45
 Tyne Bridge Act 1772 c 62
 Unfunded Debt Act 1772 c 39
 Watford Churchyard and Workhouse Act 1772 c 28
 Workhouse, Westminster Act 1772 c 34

13 Geo. 3
 Aberdeen Harbour Act 1772 c 29
 Adam Buildings Act 1772 c 75
 Ayr Harbour Act 1772 c 22
 Bedford Level: Drainage Act 1772 c 40
 Bedford Level: Drainage Act 1772 c 45
 Bedford Level: Drainage Act 1772 c 49
 Bethnal Green: Poor Relief Act 1772 c 53
 Birmingham: Improvement Act 1772 c 36
 Bread Act 1772 c 62
 Brighton: Streets Act 1772 c 34
 British Nationality Act 1772 c 21
 British Ships Act 1772 c 26
 Coal Loading – Newcastle and Sunderland Act 1772 c 22
 Corn Act 1772 c 43 (see Corn Laws)
 Counterfeiting, etc., of Gold Coin Act 1772 c 71
 Cox's Museum Act 1772 c 41
 Criminal Law Act 1772 c 31
 Customs Act 1772 c 44 - the Tea Act 1773
 Devon (Poor Relief) Act 1772 c 18
 Devon, Shire Hall Act 1772 c 16
 East India Company Act 1772 c 9
 East India Company Act 1772 c 63
 East India Company Act 1772 c 64
 Essex Gaol Act 1772 c 35
 Exeter: Small Debts Act 1772 c 27
 Frivolous Suits Act 1772 c 51
 Gaols Act 1772 c 58
 Game (England) Act 1772 c 55
 Game (Scotland) Act 1772 c 54
 Gravesend: Streets Act 1772 c 15
 Greenock: Water Supply, etc. Act 1772 c 28
 Gunpowder Mill, Tonbridge Act 1772 c 13
 Huntingdon: Drainage Act 1772 c 39
 Importation Act 1772 c 7
 Importation Act 1772 c 67
 Importation and Exportation Act 1772 c 1
 Importation and Exportation Act 1772 c 2
 Importation and Exportation Act 1772 c 3
 Importation and Exportation Act 1772 c 4
 Importation and Exportation Act 1772 c 5
 Importation and Exportation Act 1772 c 69
 Importation and Exportation Act 1772 c 70
 Importation and Exportation Act 1772 c 72
 Importation and Exportation Act 1772 c 73
 Indemnity Act 1772 c 12
 Indemnity Act 1772 c 76
 Isle of Ely, etc. : Drainage Act 1772 c 19
 Isle of Ely, etc. : Drainage Act 1772 c 20
 Isle of Ely, etc. : Drainage Act 1772 c 60
 King's Lynn: Pilotage Act 1772 c 30
 Kingston-upon-Thames: Streets Act 1772 c 61
 Land Tax Act 1772 c 8
 Lord Blessington's Will Act 1772 c 17
 Malt Duties Act 1772 c 6
 Marine Mutiny Act 1772 c 11
 Militia Pay Act 1772 c 23
 Mutiny Act 1772 c 10
 Mutiny in America Act 1772 c 24
 Naturalization Act 1772 c 25
 Newspaper Duty Act 1772 c 65
 North River, Norfolk: Navigation Act 1772 c 37
 Paper Currency in America Act 1772 c 57, also known as the Currency Act of 1773
 Petersham: Streets Act 1772 c 42
 Plate Assay (Sheffield and Birmingham) Act 1772 c 52
 Plate Glass Manufacture Act 1772 c 38
 Plate (Offences) Act 1772 c 59
 Preservation of Timber Act 1772 c 33
 Saint Marylebone: Streets Act 1772 c 48
 Sale of Spirits, etc. Act 1772 c 56
 Silk Manufacturers Act 1772 c 68
 Skipton Canal Act 1772 c 47
 Southampton: Poor Relief Act 1772 c 50
 Stealing of Vegetables Act 1772 c 32
 Supply, etc. Act 1772 c 77
 Tonnage, etc., of Ships, etc. Act 1772 c 74
 Unfunded Debt Act 1772 c 66
 West Indian Mortgages Act 1772 c 14
 Yaxley: Drainage Act 1772 c 46

1773 (13 Geo. 3)
 Highways Act 1773 c 78
 Bank of England Notes Act 1773 c 79
 Game Act 1773 c 80
 Inclosure Act 1773 c 81
 Lying-in Hospitals Act 1773 c 82
 Richmond Bridge Act 1773  Sometimes called the Richmond Bridge Act 1772. c 83.
 Turnpike Roads Act 1773 c 84
 Land at Snaith, Yorkshire Act 1773 c 85

1774 (14 Geo. 3)

 Aire and Calder Navigation Act 1774 c 96
 American Rebellion Act 1774 c 39
 American Rebellion Act 1774 c 45
 Army Act 1774 c 54
 Bank of Ayr Act 1774 c 21
 Bank of Scotland Act 1774 c 32
 Battersea Parish Church Act 1774 c 95
 Bloomsbury: Poor Relief Act 1774 c 62
 British North America (Quebec) Act 1774 c 83
 Bude Canal Act 1774 c 53
 Calder Canal Act 1774 c 13
 Cardiff: Improvement Act 1774 c 7
 Carlton Bridge, Yorkshire Act 1774 c 63
 Clapham Church Act 1774 c 12
 Clerkenwell: Streets Act 1774 c 24
 Coin Act 1774 c 70
 Composition for a Crown Debt Act 1774 c 35
 Continuance of Laws Act 1774 c 67
 Continuance of Laws Act 1774 c 80
 Continuance of Laws, etc. Act 1774 c 86
 Corn Act 1774 c 64
 Court of Chancery Act 1774 c 43
 Crown Lands-Forfeited Estates Act 1774 c 22
 Deeping Fens Act 1774 c 23
 Discharged Prisoners Act 1774 c 20
 Discovery of Longitude at Sea Act 1774 c 66
 Disposal of Ulysses Fitzmaurice's Intestate Estate Act 1774 c 40
 Distillation, etc. Act 1774 c 73
 Driving of Cattle, Metropolis Act 1774 c 87
 Duty on Cotton Stuffs, etc. Act 1774 c 72
 East India Trade Act 1774 c 34
 Exeter: Poor Relief Act 1774 c 61
 Exportation Act 1774 c 5
 Exportation Act 1774 c 10
 Exportation Act 1774 c 11
 Exportation Act 1774 c 26
 Exportation Act 1774 c 71
 Fen Drainage Act 1774 c 16
 Fife Roads and Bridges Act 1774 c 31
 Fires Prevention (Metropolis) Act 1774 c 78 (sometimes called the Building Act 1774)
 Forfeited Estates (Scotland) Act 1774 c 65
 Frauds, etc., in Woollen Manufacturers Act 1774 c 25
 Free Ports, Jamaica Act 1774 c 41
 Grosvenor Square: Paving, etc. Act 1774 c 52
 Health of Prisoners Act 1774 c 59
 Hereford Streets Act 1774 c 38
 Hops Act 1774 c 68
 Importation Act 1774 c 9
 Importation Act 1774 c 74
 Indemnity Act 1774 c 47
 Indemnity of Innkeepers Act 1774 c 60
 Insolvent Debtors, etc., Relief Act 1774 c 77
 Kinghorn Beer Duties Act 1774 c 28
 Kingston-upon-Hull Port Act 1774 c 56
 Land Tax Act 1774 c 1
 Land Tax Act 1774 c 17
 Legal Rate of Interest Act 1774 c 79
 Lewisham Church Act 1774 c 93
 Life Assurance Act 1774 c 48
 Light Silver Coin Act 1774 c 42
 Loans or Exchequer Bills Act 1774 c 69
 Macclesfield Grammar School Act 1774 c 51
 Madhouses Act 1774 c 49
 Malt Duties Act 1774 c 2
 Marine Mutiny Act 1774 c 4
 Militia Pay Act 1774 c 18
 Mutiny Act 1774 c 3
 Mutiny in America Act 1774 c 6
 National Debt Act 1774 c 76
 Naturalization Act 1774 c 84
 Papists Act 1774 c 37
 Parliamentary Elections Act 1774 c 15
 Parliamentary Elections Act 1774 c 58
 Parliamentary Elections Act 1774 c 81
 Plymouth: Streets Act 1774 c 8
 Plymouth: Fortifications Act 1774 c 50
 Quebec Finance Act 1774 c 88
 Reeling False or Short Yarn Act 1774 c 44
 Rewards for Apprehensions, Durham Act 1774 c 46
 Saint Stephen, Bristol Act 1774 c 55
 Shoreditch: Poor Relief Act 1774 c 29
 Sir Joseph Jekyll's Bequest Act 1774 c 89
 Southwark Workhouse Act 1774 c 75
 Stepney: Streets Act 1774 c 30
 Supply, etc. Act 1774 c 85
 Swansea: Improvement Act 1774 c 27
 Tetney, Lincolnshire: Inclosure Act 1774 c 33
 Thames, Navigation Act 1774 c 91
 Toxteth Park Church Act 1774 c 94
 Trade Act 1774 c 19
 Turnpikes Act 1774 c 57
 Turnpike Roads Act 1774 c 14
 Turnpike Roads Act 1774 c 36
 Turnpike Roads Act 1774 c 82
 Weights for Coin in the Mint Act 1774 c 92
 Westminster: Watching Act 1774 c 90

1775 (15 Geo. 3)

 Anstruther Easter Beer Duties Act 1775 c 48
 Appropriation Act 1775 c 42
 Argyll Roads and Bridges Act 1775 c 63
 Bedford Level: Drainage Act 1775 c 12
 Canada Act 1775 c 40
 Clan Gregour (Scotland) Act 1775 c 29
 Clerkenwell: Poor Relief Act 1775 c 23
 Colliers and Salters (Scotland) Act 1775 c 28. Also called the Colliers, etc. (Scotland) Act 1775.
 Composition for a Crown Debt Act 1775 c 19
 Copyright Act 1775 c 53
 Coventry-Oxford Canal Act 1775 c 9
 Crown Lands Act 1775 c 33
 Customs Act 1775 c 34
 Customs Act 1775 c 35
 Customs Act 1775 c 37
 East And West Flegg: Poor Relief Act 1775 c 13
 East India Company Act 1775 c 44
 Elloe, Lincoln: Small Debts Act 1775 c 64
 Erection of Cottages Act 1775 c 32
 Exportation Act 1775 c 5
 Exportation of Army Clothing Act 1775 c 45
 Fen Drainage Act 1775 c 65
 Fulbourne Church Act 1775 c 49
 Hampstead: Streets Act 1775 c 58
 Hertford Prison Act 1775 c 25
 Highgate: Streets Act 1775 c 43
 Huntingdon Clergy Charity Act 1775 c 24
 Importation Act 1775 c 1
 Importation Act 1775 c 7
 Indemnity Act 1775 c 17
 Isle of Ely, etc.,: Drainage Act 1775 c 66
 James Watt's Fire Engines Patent Act 1775 c 61
 Land Tax Act 1775 c 3
 Land Tax Act 1775 c 26
 Loans or Exchequer Bills Act 1775 c 38
 London: Streets Act 1775 c 54
 Malt Duties Act 1775 c 2
 Manchester Theatre Act 1775 c 47
 Marine Mutiny Act 1775 c 4
 Measurement of Coal Wagons, etc. Act 1775 c 27
 Mevagissey Pier, Cornwall Act 1775 c 62
 Mersey Canal Act 1775 c 20
 Militia Pay Act 1775 c 8
 Mitford and Launditch, Norfolk: Poor Relief Act 1775 c 59
 Mutiny Act 1775 c 6
 Mutiny in America Act 1775 c 15
 National Debt Act 1775 c 41
 Negotiations of Notes and Bills Act 1775 c 51
 Newfoundland Fisheries Act 1775 c 31 also known as "Palliser's Act"
 Oaths Act 1775 c 39
 Parliament Act 1775 c 36
 Picadilly: Watering Act 1775 c 57
 Porcelain Patent Act 1775 c 52
 Port Glasgow: Improvement Act 1775 c 60
 Reeling False or Short Yarn Act 1775 c 14
 Saint Marylebone: Poor Relief Act 1775 c 21
 Saint Paul, Covent Garden: Poor Relief Act 1775 c 50
 Shoreditch: Poor Relief Act 1775 c 55
 Stafford Canal Act 1775 c 16
 Supreme Court Buildings Act 1775 c 22
 Supreme Court Buildings Act 1775 c 56
 Thames Conservancy Act 1775 c 11
 Trade Act 1775 c 10 – also known as the New England Trade And Fisheries Act
 Trade Act 1775 c 18
 Tweed Fisheries Act 1775 c 46
 Weights for Coin in the Mint Act 1775 c 30

1776

16 Geo. 3

 Appropriation Act 1776 c 49
 Benthall Bridge, Severn Act 1776 c 17
 Booth's Charity, Salford Act 1776 c 55
 Boston Pilotage Act 1776 c 23
 Boston: Streets Act 1776 c 25
 Brecknock Water Supply Act 1776 c 56
 Bristol Dock Act 1776 c 33
 Camberwell and Peckham: Streets Act 1776 c 26
 Chatham: Improvement Act 1776 c 58
 Chester Lighthouse Act 1776 c 61
 Continuance of Acts, 1776 c 54
 Criminal Law Act 1776 c 43 (Also known as the "Hulks Act" and the "Hard Labour Act")
 Customs Act 1776 c 12
 Customs Act 1776 c 42
 Customs Act 1776 c 48
 Discovery of Northern Passage Act 1776 c 6
 Dorchester: Streets Act 1776 c 27
 Drury Lane Theatre Act 1776 c 13
 Duchy of Cornwall Act 1776 c 10
 Dudley Canal Act 1776 c 66
 Dundee Beer Duties Act 1776 c 16
 East India Company Act 1776 c 51
 East Kent: Drainage Act 1776 c 62
 Elizabeth Taylor's Patent Act 1776 c 18
 Exportation Act 1776 c 37
 Fen Drainage Act 1776 c 64
 Forehoe, Norfolk: Poor Relief Act 1776 c 9
 Greenwich Hospital Act 1776 c 24
 Importation Act 1776 c 8
 Importation Act 1776 c 41
 Indemnity Act 1776 c 50
 Insolvent Debtors Relief Act 1776 c 38
 Isle of Wight Guardians Act 1776 c 53
 Land Tax Act 1776 c 4
 Land Tax Act 1776 c 14
 Liardet's Cement Patent Act 1776 c 29
 Loans or Exchequer Bills Act 1776 c 35
 Loans or Exchequer Bills Act 1776 c 45
 Loughborough Navigation Act 1776 c 65
 Malt Duties Act 1776 c 1
 Manchester: Streets Act 1776 c 63
 Marine Mutiny Act 1776 c 7
 Militia Act 1776 c 3
 Militia Pay Act 1776 c 19
 Mint Prosecutions Expenses Act 1776 c 46
 Mutiny Act 1776 c 2
 Mutiny on America Act 1776 c 11
 Natural-born Children of Aliens Act 1776 c 52
 Navigation Act 1776 c 20
 Pilchard Fishery, Cornwall Act 1776 c 36
 Poor Act 1776 c 40
 Portsmouth: Streets Act 1776 c 59
 Prohibitory Act c 5.  Also called the American Prohibitory Act. 
 Saint George's Middlesex: Poor Relief Act 1776 c 15
 Shoreditch: Streets Act 1776 c 60
 Stealing of Deer Act 1776 c 30
 Stourbridge Canal Act 1776 c 28
 Stroudwater Navigation Act 1776 c 21
 Tardebigg Church, Worcester and Warwick Act 1776 c 22
 Taxation Act 1776 c 34
 Theatre Royal, Covent Garden Act 1776 c 31
 Trent and Mersey Canal Act 1776 c 32
 Turnpike Roads Act 1776 c 39
 Turnpike Roads Act 1776 c 44
 Weymouth: Improvement Act 1776 c 57
 Whale Fishery, etc. Act 1776 c 47

17 Geo. 3
 Adulteration of Tea Act 1776 c 29
 Appropriation Act 1776 c 47
 Auctioneers' Licences Act 1776 c 50
 Bill of Exchange Act 1776 c 30
 Bricks and Tiles Act 1776 c 42
 Burntisland Beer Duties Act 1776 c 20
 Captures Act 1776 c 40
 Chester Theatre Act 1776 c 14
 Church, Buckingham Act 1776 c 32
 Civil List Act 1776 c 21
 Clergy Residences Repair Act 1776 c 53
 Coal Measurement, London Act 1776 c 13
 Coalport Bridge over Severn (Tolls, etc.) Act 1776 c 12
 Composition for a Crown Debt Act 1776 c 31
 Composition for a Crown Debt Act 1776 c 49
 Continuance of Laws Act 1776 c 44
 Crown Lands at Enfield, Middlesex Act 1776 c 17
 Customs Act 1776 c 27
 Customs Act 1776 c 41
 Customs Act 1776 c 43
 Duties on Soap, etc. Act 1776 c 52
 Dyers Act 1776 c 33
 East India Company Act 1776 c 8
 Exportation Act 1776 c 28
 Finding of the Longitude at Sea Act 1776 c 48
 First Meetings of Commissioners, etc. Act 1776 c 36
 Grants of Life Annuities Act 1776 c 26
 Hartley's Patent (Fire Prevention) Act 1776 c 6
 Importation Act 1776 c 35
 Indemnity Act 1776 c 37
 Islington: Poor Relief, etc. Act 1776 c 5
 Land Tax Act 1776 c 1
 Loans or Exchequer Bills Act 1776 c 38
 Loans or Exchequer Bills Act 1776 c 51
 London: Streets Act 1776 c 22
 London: Streets Act 1776 c 23
 Malt Duties Act 1776 c 2
 Manufacture of Hats Act 1776 c 55
 Marine Mutiny Act 1776 c 4
 Militia Pay Act 1776 c 10
 Mutiny Act 1776 c 3
 National Debt Act 1776 c 46
 Navigation Act 1776 c 34
 Old Swineford: Small Debts Act 1776 c 19
 Papists Act 1776 c 45
 Privateers Act 1776 c 7
 Taxation Act 1776 c 39
 Thames Navigation Act 1776 c 18
 Turnpike Roads Act 1776 c 16
 Westmorland Gaol, etc. Act 1776 c 54
 Wolverhampton: Improvements Act 1776 c 25
 Worsted Act 1776 c 11
 York Buildings Company, Sale of Scottish Estates Act 1776 c 24
 Yorkshire: Small Debts Act 1776 c 15

1777 (17 Geo. 3)

 Bedford Level: Drainage Act 1777 c 65
 Clerkenwell: Streets Act 1777 c 63
 Erewash Canal Act 1777 c 69
 Frauds by Workmen Act 1777 c 56
 Kensington: Poor Relief Act 1777 c 64
 Lincoln: Drainage Act 1777 c 70
 Lincolnshire: Small Debts Act 1777 c 62
 Maismore Bridge, Severn Act 1777 c 68
 Mile End Night Watch Act 1777 c 66
 Nantwich Canal Act 1777 c 67
 Prints Copyright Act 1777 c 57
 Rolls Estate Act 1777 c 59
 Rugby School and Alms-houses Act 1777 c 71
 Shoreditch (Hoxton Square): Improvement Act 1777 c 60
 Treason Act 1777 c 9. Also called the Habeas Corpus Suspension Act 1776 or the Habeas Corpus Suspension Act 1777.
 Warwick Gaol Act 1777 c 58
 Westminster: Streets Act 1777 c 61

1778 (18 Geo. 3)

 Achurch Parish Church Act 1778 c 9
 American Rebellion Act 1778 c 13
 Appropriation Act 1778 c 54
 Basingstoke Canal Act 1778 c 75
 Bodmin Gaol Act 1778 c 17
 Bristol Theatre Act 1778 c 8
 Christchurch, Stepney: Poor Relief, etc. Act 1778 c 74
 Continuance of Laws Act 1778 c 45
 Criminal Law Act 1778 c 62
 Crown Lands, Forfeited Estates (Ireland) Act 1778 c 61
 Crown Lands-Greenwich Hospital Act 1778 c 29
 Customs Act 1778 c 24
 Customs Act 1778 c 25
 Customs Act 1778 c 27
 Customs Act 1778 c 40
 Customs Act 1778 c 58
 Dover Streets Act 1778 c 76
 Duty on Servants Act 1778 c 30
 Exportation Act 1778 c 16
 Exportation, etc. Act 1778 c 55
 Findhorn Harbour Act 1778 c 70
 Fisheries (Severn and Verniew) Act 1778 c 33
 Forgery Act 1778 c 18
 Glamorgan, Llansamlett-Llangevelach Bridge, River Tawey Act 1778 c 68
 Goodman's Fields Act 1778 c 50
 Habeas Corpus Suspension Act 1778 c 1
 Halliwell and Finsbury Drainage Act 1778 c 66
 Henley Grammar School Act 1778 c 41
 Hexham Bridge Act 1778 c 44
 House Duty Act 1778 c 26
 Importation Act 1778 c 56
 Indemnity Act 1778 c 39
 Insolvent Debtors Relief, etc. Act 1778 c 52
 Isle of Ely: Small Debts Act 1778 c 36
 Jeremy's Ferry Bridge, River Lee Act 1778 c 10
 Land Tax Act 1778 c 2
 Land Tax Act 1778 c 23
 Lincoln: Small Debts Act 1778 c 43
 Lincolnshire: Small Debts Act 1778 c 34
 Loans or Exchequer Bills Act 1778 c 38
 Loans or Exchequer Bills Act 1778 c 57
 Loans or Exchequer Bills Act 1778 c 64
 London: Streets Act 1778 c 71
 London: Streets Act 1778 c 73
 Malt Duties Act 1778 c 3
 Marine Mutiny Act 1778 c 5
 Middlesex Sessions House Act 1778 c 67
 Militia Act 1778 c 14
 Militia, etc. Act 1778 c 59
 Mutiny Act 1778 c 4
 Nantwich Canal Act 1778 c 21
 National Debt Act 1778 c 22
 Navigation Act 1778 c 6
 Newgate Gaol and Sessions House Act 1778 c 48
 Northampton: Improvement Act 1778 c 79
 Papists Act 1778 c 46
 Papists Act 1778 c 60
 Parish Apprentices Act 1778 c 47
 Payment of Charges of Constables Act 1778 c 19
 Prize Act 1778 c 15
 Province of Massachusetts Bay Act 1778 c 11
 Provision for Earl of Chatham Act 1778 c 65
 Ratcliffe Highway Act 1778 c 49
 Recruiting Act 1778 c 53
 Rye Harbour Act 1778 c 32
 Scarborough Pier Act 1778 c 20
 Settlement on Royal Princes, etc. Act 1778 c 31
 Shoreditch: Streets Act 1778 c 77
 Small Rocks Lighthouse Act 1778 c 42
 Southwark: Streets Act 1778 c 51
 Spitalfields: Streets Act 1778 c 78
 Stirling: Roads and Bridges Act 1778 c 69
 Stow, Suffolk: Poor Relief Act 1778 c 35
 Taxation of Colonies Act 1778 c 12
 Turnpike Roads Act 1778 c 28
 Turnpike Roads Act 1778 c 63
 Westminster: Improvement Act 1778 c 72
 Whitechapel: Improvement Act 1778 c 37
 Whitechapel: Improvement Act 1778 c 80
 Wigtown Roads Act 1778 c 7

1779 (19 Geo. 3)

 Appropriation Act 1779 c 71
 Auction Duties, etc. Act 1779 c 56
 Bath Hospital. Act 1779 c 23
 Bedford Level: Drainage Act 1779 c 24
 Bounties Act 1779 c 27
 Bounty on Hemp Act 1779 c 37
 Bridgwater Markets Act 1779 c 36
 Burton-on-Trent: Improvement Act 1779 c 39
 Church, Macclesfield Act 1779 c 7
 Composition for a Crown Debt Act 1779 c 77
 Continuance of Laws Act 1779 c 22
 Cosford, Suffolk: Poor Relief Act 1779 c 30
 Court-martial on Admiral Keppel Act 1779 c 6
 Criminal Law Act 1779 c 54
 Customs Act 1779 c 4
 Customs Act 1779 c 29
 Customs Act 1779 c 41
 Customs Act 1779 c 62
 Distillers Act 1779 c 50
 Duchy of Lancaster Act 1779 c 45
 Duties on Houses, etc. Act 1779 c 59
 Duties on Starch Act 1779 c 40
 East India Company Act 1779 c 61
 Exchequer Court (Scotland) Act 1779 c 38
 First Meetings of Commissioners, etc. Act 1779 c 55
 Habeas Corpus Suspension Act 1779 c 1
 Hartsmere, etc., Suffolk: Poor Relief. Act 1779 c 13
 Importation Act 1779 c 28
 Importation of Silk Act 1779 c 9
 Indemnity Act 1779 c 47
 Inferior Courts Act 1779 c 70
 Lancaster: Drainage Act 1779 c 33
 Land Tax Act 1779 c 2
 Leeds Coal Supply Act 1779 c 11
 Lincolnshire: Small Debts Act 1779 c 43
 Linlithgow Roads and Bridges Act 1779 c 12
 Loans or Exchequer Bills Act 1779 c 63
 Loans or Exchequer Bills Act 1779 c 64
 Loans or Exchequer Bills Act 1779 c 73
 Lottery Office Keepers Act 1779 c 21
 Madhouses Act 1779 c 15
 Malt Duties Act 1779 c 3
 Marine Mutiny Act 1779 c 8
 Militia Act 1779 c 76
 Militia, etc. Act 1779 c 72
 Militia Pay Act 1779 c 19
 Ministers' Widows Fund (Scotland) Act 1779 c 20
 Mutiny Act 1779 c 16
 National Debt Act 1779 c 18
 Naval Courts-martial Act 1779 c 17
 Navigation Act 1779 c 14
 Navy Act 1779 c 67
 Navy Act 1779 c 75
 Nonconformist Relief Act 1779 c 44
 Parish of the Trinity, Coventry Act 1779 c 57
 Payment of Lace Makers' Wages Act 1779 c 49
 Pembroke Gaol Act 1779 c 46
 Penitentiary Act 1799 c 74. Also called the Transportation, etc. Act 1779. 
 Prize Act 1779 c 5
 Recruiting Act 1779 c 10
 River Lee Navigation Act 1779 c 58
 Salaries of Judges Act 1779 c 65
 Shipping and Navigation Act 1779 c 48
 Small Debts, Tower Hamlets Act 1779 c 68
 Smuggling, etc. Act 1779 c 69
 Somerset Roads Act 1779 c 32
 Stamp Duties Act 1779 c 66
 Swaffham: Drainage Act 1779 c 34
 Taxation Act 1779 c 25
 Taxation Act 1779 c 51
 Taxation Act 1779 c 52
 Taxation Act 1779 c 53
 Tithes, Coventry Act 1779 c 60
 Tobacco Act 1779 c 35
 Tyne Bridge Act 1779 c 78
 Wells, Somerset: Improvement Act 1779 c 31
 White Herring Fishery Act 1779 c 26
 Worcester Bridge Act 1779 c 42

See also
List of Acts of the Parliament of Great Britain

References
 Chronological Table of and Index to the Statutes. Thirteenth Edition. Printed for HMSO. London. 1896. Volume 1. Pages 119 to 138.

External links
The Statutes at Large
- Volume 23 - 33 George II to 1 George III - 1759-60 to 1760-1
- Volume 24 - Index
- Volume 25 - 2 George III - 1761-2 - and 3 George III - 1762-3 - also
- Volume 26 - 4 George III - 1763-4 - and 5 George III - 1765 - also - also - also
- Volume 27 - 6 George III - 1765-6 - and 7 George III - 1766-7 - also
- Volume 28 - 8 George III - 1767-8 - 9 George III - 1768-9 - and 10 George III - 1770 - also
- Volume 29 - 11 George III - 1770-1 - and 12 George III - 1772
- Volume 30 - 13 George III - 1772-3 - and 14 George III - 1774 - also
- Volume 31 - 15 George III - 1774-5 - and 16 George III - 1775-6 - and 17 George III - 1776-7
- Volume 32 - 18 George III - 1777-8 - and 19 George III - 1778-9

1760
1760s in Great Britain
1770s in Great Britain